For the Tournament of Roses Parade, top marching bands from all over the world are invited. Many of the nation's top high school marching bands participate, along with college and organizational marching bands. Prior to the parade, most of the bands will participate in one of three "Bandfest" shows at Pasadena City College and at other Southern California venues.

The bands participating in the parade have also developed traditions. For example, Pasadena City College's Lancer Marching Band always marches in the Rose Parade, along with high school band and color guard students from all over Southern California, who are selected by audition the previous autumn. The Tournament of Roses Honor Band is a coveted position, and those selected are among the best student musicians in California.   Nine of the high school trumpet players, selected by performance on their auditions, and the best snare drummer, are selected as the Herald Trumpets, who march directly before the Rose Queen's float and play fanfares.

University marching bands from the two schools participating in the Rose Bowl Game, along with their spirit squads, are invited to march in the parade. They typically accompany the floats that represent the conferences.

In 1891, the Monrovia City Band was the first musical group to perform in the Rose Parade. T.M. Hotchkiss, Historical Section of the Friends of the Monrovia Library wrote in 1986 that "Albert E. Cronenwett organized and led the Monrovia City Band. It went wherever music was needed. On New Year's Day in 1891 it was the first musical organization to march in the Tournament of Roses Parade in Pasadena. "Cronnie's Band" will long be remembered."

Bands that have a long-standing arrangement to be in the parade include:
 The Pasadena City College Tournament of Roses Honor Band
 The Los Angeles Unified School District All District High School Honor Band
 The Salvation Army marching band (100th appearance in 2019)
 The United States Marine Corps West Coast Composite Band

In 1965, the Mississippi Valley State College (Mississippi Valley State University) Marching Band was the first HBCU marching band to be invited to participate in the Rose Parade. They were also the first HBCU band to be invited back a second time to participate in the parade.

In 1998, the Washington Township High School Minutemen Marching Band from Sewell, New Jersey, became the first band in the history of the Rose Parade to decorate its entire ranks with live flowers, in keeping with the practice of decorating the parade floats. Designed by Todd Marcocci, this unique concept and design approach received tremendous support from all major media around the world.  Since then, several bands have followed suit.

Bandfest
Also, most of the bands participate in Bandfest, which is sponsored by Remo, where bands perform their field shows at Pasadena City College's Mack and Jackie Robinson Stadium over two days.  Bandfest consists of three shows (one on the first day and two on the second day).  A percussion group from Remo leads a drum circle with the audience, who have received complimentary Remo drumheads and sticks prior to the event.  The Pasadena City College Honor Band and Herald Trumpets perform first, followed by other bands.  All bands are invited to perform at Bandfest, but all do not necessarily perform (typically the university bands involved in the Rose Bowl Game).  The band members are treated to lunch from In-N-Out Burger with on-site kitchen-trailers.

List of Bands

1930 
 American Legion Massed Drum and Bugle Corps of 200
 Benevolent and Protective Order of Elks Band
 Burbank Municipal Band
 Caliente Band
 California Institute of Technology Band
 Franklin High School Marching Band
 Huntington Park High School Band
 John Marshall Junior High School Marching Band
 Long Beach Municipal Band
 Pasadena Bag Pipe Band
 Pasadena G.A.R. Fife and Drum Corps
 Pasadena Sciots Band
 Redondo Beach Girls' Band
 Roberts' Golden State Band
 Salvation Army Band
 Santa Monica Municipal Band
 Taft High School Girls' Band
 Tournament of Roses Honor Band (Pasadena City College)
 Union Pacific Band
 University of Southern California Marching Band
 Van Nuys-Owensmouth High School Band

1931 
 Benevolent and Protective Order of Elks Band
 Burbank Municipal Band
 California Institute of Technology Band
 Franklin Regional High School Marching Band
 Huntington Park High School Band
 Inglewood Boys' Band Marching Band
 Jinnistan Grotto Bag Pipe Band
 Long Beach Municipal Band
 Pasadena Civic Orchestra
 Pasadena Bag Pipe Band
 Pasadena G.A.R. Fife and Drum Corps
 Pasadena Junior College Girls' Band
 Pasadena Sciots Band
 Redondo Beach Girls' Band
 Roberts' Golden State Band
 San Fernando High School Marching Band
 St. Elizabeth School Band
 Tournament of Roses Honor Band (Pasadena City College)
 Union Pacific Band
 Ventura High School Band
 Washington Junior High School Band

1932 
 Antelope Valley Band
 Bakersfield High School Marching Band
 Burbank Municipal Band
 Inglewood Boys' Band Marching Band
 Jinnistan Grotto Bag Pipe Band
 John Muir High School Marching Band
 Long Beach Municipal Band
 Massed Color and Drum Corps
 Pasadena Bag Pipe Band
 Pasadena Elks' Band
 Pasadena G.A.R. Fife and Drum Corps
 Pasadena Junior College Band
 Pasadena Junior College Girls' Band
 Pasadena Sciots Band
 Roberts' Golden State Band
 Salvation Army Band
 San Fernando High School Marching Band
 Southern California Girls' band
 St. Elizabeth Boy's Band
 Tournament of Roses Honor Band (Pasadena City College)
 Union Pacific Band
 University of Southern California Marching Band
 Van Nuys-Canoga High School Marching Band
 Whittier Municipal Band

1933 
 Inglewood Boys' Band Marching Band
 Long Beach Municipal Band
 McKinley Junior High School Marching Band
 Pasadena Junior College Girls' Band
 Pasadena Sciots Band
 Santa Ana American Legion Band
 Santa Barbara State College Band
 Santa Monica Municipal Band
 Southern California Girls' band
 Tournament of Roses Honor Band (Pasadena City College)
 University of California at Los Angeles Marching Band
 University of Southern California Marching Band

1934 
 Bakersfield Junior College and High School Band
 Eliot Junior High School Marching Band
 Greater San Diego Band
 Harold Williams Roberts Mounted Band
 Inglewood Boys' Band Marching Band
 Leland Stanford Junior University Marching Band
 Lompoc Municipal Band
 Long Beach Municipal Band
 Los Angeles Harbor Band
 North Hollywood Band
 Orange County Band
 Roberts' Golden State Band
 Safeway Employees Association Band
 Salvation Army Band
 Santa Barbara State College Band
 Santa Monica Band
 Scotch Kiltie band
 South Gate Boys Band
 South Pasadena High School Marching Band
 Southern California Girls' band
 Tournament of Roses Honor Band (Pasadena City College)
 Ventura Junior College Marching Band

1935 
 Antelope Valley Band
 Bakersfield Junior College and High School Band
 Burbank High School Marching Band
 Eliot Junior High School Marching Band
 Greater San Diego Boys' Band
 John Muir High School Marching Band
 Leland Stanford Junior University Marching Band
 Long Beach Municipal Band
 Maricopa High School Marching Band
 Orange County Band
 Roberts' Golden State Band
 Safeway Employees Association Band
 Salvation Army Band
 Santa Barbara State College Band
 South Pasadena High School Marching Band
 Tournament of Roses Honor Band (Pasadena City College)
 University of California at Los Angeles Marching Band
 Ventura Junior College Marching Band
 Victor McLaglen's Light Horse Band

1936 
 Antelope Valley Band
 Arizona State Teachers College band
 Bonham Brothers San Diego Boys' Band
 Burbank City School Band
 Fresno State College Band
 Glendale Oaks Band
 Inglewood Boys' Band Marching Band
 John Marshall Junior High School Marching Band
 John T. Boudreau Symphonic Band
 Leland Stanford Junior University Marching Band
 Lompoc Municipal Band
 Long Beach Municipal Band
 Pomona Junior College and High School Marching Band
 Roberts' Golden State Band
 Safeway Employees Association Band
 Salvation Army Band
 San Fernando High School Marching Band
 South Gate Boys Band
 South Pasadena High School Marching Band
 Tournament of Roses Honor Band (Pasadena City College)
 University of California at Los Angeles Marching Band
 Victor McLaglen's Light Horse Band

1937 
 Arizona State Teachers College band
 Burbank High School Marching Band
 Elks Symphonic Band
 John T. Boudreau Symphonic Band
 Long Beach Municipal Band
 McKinley Junior High School Marching Band
 Musician's Post Band
 Safeway Employees Association Band
 Salvation Army Band
 San Fernando High School Marching Band
 South Gate Boys and Girls Band
 Tournament of Roses Honor Band (Pasadena City College)
 University of California at Los Angeles Marching Band
 Victor McLaglen's Light Horse Band
 Vina MacAdams All-Girl Pipe Band

1938 
 Burbank High School Marching Band
 Eliot Junior High School Marching Band
 Elk's Symphonic Band
 John Muir High School Marching Band
 John T. Boudreau Symphonic Band
 Long Beach Polytechnic High School Marching Band
 Loyola University Marching Band
 Musician's Post Band
 Salvation Army Band
 San Fernando High School Marching Band
 South Pasadena High School Marching Band
 Tournament of Roses Honor Band (Pasadena City College)
 University of California at Los Angeles Marching Band
 University of California Berkley Marching Band
 World War Veterans Pipe Band

1939 
 16th Canadian Scottish Bagpipe Band
 Burbank High School Marching Band
 Charles Post Band
 Elk's Symphonic Band
 John Marshall Junior High School Marching Band
 John T. Boudreau Symphonic Band
 Long Beach Polytechnic High School Marching Band
 Musician's Post Band
 Pomona Junior College Marching Band
 Salvation Army Band
 San Fernando High School Marching Band
 Santa Barbara State College Band
 South Pasadena High School Marching Band
 Tournament of Roses Honor Band (Pasadena City College)
 University of California at Los Angeles Marching Band
 University of Southern California Marching Band
 Unknown Band (Prologue)
 Ventura Junior College Marching Band

1940 
 Babich Symphonic Band
 Bonham Brothers Boys' Band
 Bourdreau Symphonic Band
 Burbank High School Marching Band
 Elks Symphonic Band
 Glendale Elks Club Band
 Long Beach Junior College Band
 Lynwood Junior High School Band
 McKinley Junior High School Marching Band
 Orange Union High School Band
 Pasadena Junior College Music Alumni
 Post Symphonic Band
 Salvation Army Band
 San Gabriel Police Boys' Band
 Sheriff Boy's Band
 Tournament of Roses Honor Band (Pasadena City College)
 University of California at Los Angeles Marching Band
 University of Southern California Marching Band

1941 
 Bonham Brothers Boys' Band
 Chaffey High School and Junior College Band
 Compton Junior College Band
 Eliot Junior High School Marching Band
 Elks' Symphonic Band
 Golden West Symphonic Band
 John T. Boudreau Symphonic Band
 Leland Stanford Junior University Marching Band
 Long Beach Junior College Band
 Los Angeles District No. 6 Band
 Post Symphonic Band
 Salvation Army Band
 San Gabriel Police Boys' Band
 South Pasadena-San Marino High School Band
 Southwest Boys' and Girls' Band
 Tournament of Roses Honor Band (Pasadena City College)
 University of Nebraska Marching Band
 Ventura Junior College Marching Band

1946 
 Bonham Brothers Boys' Band
 Boudreau's Symphonic Band
 Compton Junior College Marching Band
 Elks Symphonic Band
 Huntington Park City Junior Band
 Lynwood Junior High School Band
 Pomona Junior College Marching Band
 Salvation Army Band
 San Marino High School Band
 Santa Barbara High School Marching Band
 Sherman Institute Indian Band
 The Post Band
 Tournament of Roses Honor Band (Pasadena City College)
 University of Southern California Marching Band
 Wilkin's Hollywood Swing Band
 Woodrow Wilson High School Marching Band

1947 
 Bonham Brothers Boys' Band
 Camas High School Band
 Compton College Band
 Huntington Park Band
 Long Beach All Girls Band
 Muir Junior College Band
 Portland-Roosevelt High School Band
 Salvation Army Band
 Santa Barbara High School Marching Band
 Santa Monica High School Band
 South Pasadena-San Marino High School Band
 Tournament of Roses Honor Band (Pasadena City College)
 Union Band
 University of California at Los Angeles Marching Band
 Washington Junior High School Band

1948 
 Alhambra Marching Band
 Bonham Brothers Boys' Band
 Butte High School Marching Band
 Glendale Band
 Huntington Park Band
 John Muir College Band
 Las Vegas Band
 Long Beach All Girls Band
 Pasadena Junior High Schools Band
 Salvation Army Band
 Santa Monica Band
 Sheriff Boy's Band
 South Pasadena Band
 Tournament of Roses Honor Band (Pasadena City College)
 Union Band
 University of Michigan Marching Band
 University of Southern California Marching Band

1949 
 All City Junior High Band
 Antelope Valley High School Marching Band
 Bakersfield High School Marching Band
 Bonham Brothers Boys' Band
 Compton College Band
 Elks Symphonic Band
 Glendale Police Boys Band
 Grafton High School Marching Band
 Huntington Park Band
 John Muir High School Marching Band
 Long Beach Band
 Los Angeles Dons Band
 Northwestern University Marching Band
 Salvation Army Band
 Samohl Band
 San Bernardino Valley Marching Band
 Sheriff Boy's Band
 Tournament of Roses Honor Band (Pasadena City College)
 United States Marine Corps Band
 University of California Marching Band

1950 
 Alhambra High School Marching Band
 Bakersfield High School Marching Band
 Bonham Brothers Boys Band
 Elks Symphonic Band
 Glendale College Band Marching Band
 Huntington Park City Junior Band
 John Muir Junior College Marching Band
 Long Beach All-District High School Marching Band
 Los Angeles County Sheriff's Boys Band
 Pasadena All-City Junior High School Marching Band
 Polytechnic High School Marching Band
 Pomona High School Marching Band
 Salvation Army Band
 Selma High School Marching Band
 South Gate High School Marching Band
 The Ohio State University Marching Band
 Tournament of Roses Honor Band (Pasadena City College)
 United States Marine Corps Band
 University of California Berkley Marching Band
 Ventura Junior College Marching Band

1951 
 Bakersfield High School Marching Band
 Barstow Union High School Marching Band
 Bonham Brothers Boys Band
 Deputy Auxiliary Police Band
 Elks Symphonic Band
 Glendale Police Boys' Band
 Grafton Parade Band
 Huntington Park City Junior Band
 Inglewood High School Marching Band
 John Muir Junior College Marching Band
 Long Beach City College Marching Band
 Mark Keppel High School Marching Band
 Pasadena All-City Junior High School Marching Band
 Salvation Army Band
 San Bernardino Valley College Marching Band
 Santa Monica High School Marching Band
 Tournament of Roses Honor Band (Pasadena City College)
 United States Marine Corps Band
 University of California Berkley Marching Band
 University of Michigan Marching Band

1952 
 Alhambra High School Marching Band
 Antelope Valley Junior High School Marching Band
 Bakersfield High School Marching Band
 Bonham Brothers Boys Band
 Elks Symphonic Band
 Glendale High School Marching Band
 Huntington Park City Junior Band
 Inglewood Boys' Band Marching Band
 John Muir High School Marching Band
 Leland Stanford Junior University Marching Band
 Los Angeles County Sheriff's Boys Band
 Los Angeles Dept. of Parks & Recreation Marching Band
 Pomona High School Marching Band
 Salvation Army Band
 South Gate City Youth Band
 South Pasadena/San Marino High School Band South
 Tournament of Roses Honor Band (Pasadena City College)
 United States Marine Corps Band
 University of Illinois Marching Band
 Woodrow Wilson High School Marching Band

1953 
 Al Malaikah Shrine Band
 Bonham Brothers Boys Band
 Deputy Auxiliary Police Band
 Elks Symphonic Band
 Grossmont High School Marching Band
 Herbert Hoover High School Marching Band
 Huntington Park City Junior Band
 Inglewood Boys' Band Marching Band
 Long Beach Polytechnic High School Marching Band
 Mark Keppel High School Marching Band
 Muir College Marching Band
 Polytechnic High School Marching Band
 Salvation Army Band
 San Bernardino Valley College Marching Band
 Tournament of Roses Honor Band (Pasadena City College)
 Tulare Union High School Marching Band
 United States Air Force Band
 United States Marine Corps Band
 University of Southern California Marching Band
 University of Wisconsin Marching Band

1954 
 Alhambra High School Marching Band
 Bonham Brothers Boys Band
 Elks Symphonic Band
 Glendale Police Boys' Band
 Grossmont High School Marching Band
 Huntington Park City Junior Band
 John Muir Junior College Marching Band
 Jordan High School Marching Band
 Los Angeles County Sheriff's Boys Band
 Michigan State University Marching Band
 Mount Lebanon High School Marching Band
 Norwalk High School Marching Band
 Polytechnic High School Marching Band
 Salvation Army Band
 South Gate City Youth Band
 Tournament of Roses Honor Band (Pasadena City College)
 United States Air Corps Band
 United States Marine Corps Band
 United States Sixth Army Band
 University of California at Los Angeles Marching Band

1955 
 Academy High School Marching Band
 Antelope Valley Junior High School Marching Band
 Beaumont Cougar Band Marching Band
 Bonham Brothers Boys Band
 Cardinal Whittier High School Marching Band
 Downey High School Marching Band
 Elks Topper Band
 Glendale High School Marching Band
 Grant High School Marching Band
 Inglewood Boys' Band Marching Band
 Long Beach City College Marching Band
 Los Angeles Deputy Police Auxiliary Band
 Mark Keppel High School Marching Band
 Montebello High School Marching Band
 Saint Mary's Band
 Salvation Army Band
 The Ohio State University Marching Band
 Tournament of Roses Honor Band (Pasadena City College)
 United States Marine Corps Band
 United States Military Academy Band
 University of Southern California Marching Band

1956 
 Alhambra High School Marching Band
 Arcadia High School Marching Band
 Bonham Brothers Boys Band
 Burbank High School Marching Band
 Elks Topper Band
 Henryetta High School Marching Band
 Herbert Hoover High School Marching Band
 Huntington Park City Junior Band
 Los Angeles County Sheriff's Boys Band
 Massillon High School Marching Band
 Michigan State University Marching Band
 Picayune High School Marching Band
 Riverside Band
 Salvation Army Band
 South Gate High School Marching Band
 Tournament of Roses Honor Band (Pasadena City College)
 United States Air Force Band
 United States Marine Corps Band
 University of California at Los Angeles Marching Band
 Woodrow Wilson High School Marching Band

1957 
 Baker High School Marching Band
 Bellingham High School Marching Band
 Bonham Brothers Boys Band
 Edina-Morningside High School Marching Band
 Elks Topper Band
 Glendale Police Boys' Band
 Independent Order of Foresters Marching Band
 Inglewood Boys' Band Marching Band
 Long Beach Junior Concert Band
 Los Angeles Police Junior Band
 Mark Keppel High School Marching Band
 Oregon State University Marching Band
 Pacific Coast Scottish Pipe Band
 Salvation Army Band
 South Gate City Youth Band
 Thomas Jefferson High School Marching Band
 Tournament of Roses Honor Band (Pasadena City College)
 United States Marine Corps Band
 United States Navy Band
 University of Iowa Marching Band

1958 
 Alhambra High School Marching Band
 Ben Ali Temple Oriental Band
 Bonham Brothers Boys Band
 Burbank Police Boys' Marching Band
 Cocoa High School Marching Band
 Elks Topper Band
 Huntington Park City Junior Band
 Independent Order of Foresters Marching Band
 Long Beach Polytechnic High School Marching Band
 Los Angeles County Sheriff's Boys Band
 Louisville Male High School Marching Band
 Occidental College Marching Band
 Polytechnic High School Marching Band
 Ponca City High School Marching Band
 Salvation Army Band
 Shawnee Mission District High School Marching Band
 The Ohio State University Marching Band
 Tournament of Roses Honor Band (Pasadena City College)
 United States Marine Corps Band
 University of Oregon Marching Band

1959 
 Antelope Valley High School Marching Band
 Bonham Brothers Boys Band
 Clifton High School Marching Band
 Coachella Valley Union High School Marching Band
 Columbus High School Marching Band
 Dr. Pepper Toppers Marching Band
 Glendale High School Marching Band
 Jordan High School Marching Band
 Los Angeles Police Junior Band
 Mark Keppel High School Marching Band
 Mount Lebanon High School Marching Band
 Oconomowoc American Legion Band
 Phoenix Indian High School Marching Band
 Saint Mary's Chinese Girls Band
 Salvation Army Band
 South Gate City Youth Band
 Tournament of Roses Honor Band (Pasadena City College)
 United States Marine Corps Band
 University of California Berkley Marching Band
 University of Iowa Marching Band

1960 
 Alhambra High School Marching Band
 Byrd High School Marching Band
 Chicago Fire Dept. Marching Band
 Downey High School Marching Band
 Dr. Pepper Toppers Marching Band
 El Cajon High School Marching Band
 Independent Order of Foresters Marching Band
 John Burroughs High School Marching Band
 Los Angeles County Sheriff's Boys Band
 Millikan High School Marching Band
 Red Raider High School Marching Band
 Ruskin High School Marching Band
 Salvation Army Band
 Santa Monica High School and College Marching Band
 Tournament of Roses Honor Band (Pasadena City College)
 United States Marine Corps Band
 University of Washington Marching Band
 University of Wisconsin Marching Band
 Warwick Veterans Memorial High School Marching Band
 Weir High School Marching Band

1961 
 Adams State College Marching Band
 Blackwell High School Marching Band
 De La Warr High School Marching Band
 Dodge City High School Marching Band
 Grossmont High School Marching Band
 Herbert Hoover High School Marching Band
 Lakewood High School Marching Band
 Los Angeles Police Junior Band
 Manteca Union High School Marching Band
 Montebello High School Marching Band
 Porterville High School Marching Band
 S. & H. Green Stamp Topper Marching Band
 Salvation Army Band
 San Francisco Boys' Club Band
 Torrance All-Star High School Marching Band
 Tournament of Roses Honor Band (Pasadena City College)
 United States Marine Corps Band
 University of Minnesota Marching Band
 University of Washington Marching Band
 Whittier High School Marching Band

1962 
 Abington Township High School Marching Band
 Andrew Hill High School Marching Band
 Burbank High School Marching Band
 El Cajon High School Marching Band
 Fitchburg High School Marching Band
 Hillsboro Union High School Marching Band
 Independent Order of Foresters Marching Band
 Long Beach All-District High School Marching Band
 Los Angeles County Sheriff's Boys Band
 Mark Keppel High School Marching Band
 Mesquite High School Marching Band
 Oxnard High School Marching Band
 S. & H. Green Stamp Topper Marching Band
 Salvation Army Band
 San Francisco Boys' Club Band
 Santa Monica High School Marching Band
 Tournament of Roses Honor Band (Pasadena City College)
 United States Marine Corps Band
 University of California at Los Angeles Marching Band
 University of Minnesota Marching Band

1963 
 Amos Alonzo Stagg High School Marching Band
 Arcadia High School Marching Band
 Ben Davis High School Marching Band
 Boone High School Marching Band
 Downey City Youth Band
 Glendale High School Marching Band
 Lakewood High School Marching Band
 Long Beach All-District High School Marching Band
 Los Angeles Police Junior Band
 Montebello High School Marching Band
 Mount Miguel High School Marching Band
 Pocatello High School Marching Band
 S. & H. Green Stamp Topper Marching Band
 Salvation Army Band
 Tournament of Roses Honor Band (Pasadena City College)
 Treadwell High School Marching Band
 United States Marine Corps Band
 University of Southern California Marching Band
 University of Wisconsin Marching Band
 Vinson High School Marching Band
 Whittier High School Marching Band

1964 
 Alhambra High School Marching Band
 Berkeley High School Marching Band
 Burbank Police Boys' Marching Band
 Calexico High School Marching Band
 Glendora High School Marching Band
 Isaac Litton High School Marching Band
 Long Beach All-District High School Marching Band
 Melvindale High School Marching Band
 Montana Centennial Marching Band
 Mount Miguel High School Marching Band
 Mutual Savings & Loan "Toppers" Band (Union Band)
 Nyssa High School Marching Band
 Pasadena High School Marching Band
 Prince George High School Marching Band
 Roosevelt High School Marching Band
 Salvation Army Band
 South Gate City Youth Band
 Tournament of Roses Honor Band (Pasadena City College)
 United States Marine Corps Band
 United States Sixth Army Band
 University of Illinois Marching Band
 University of Washington Marching Band

1965 
 American Legion Indian Band
 Antelope Valley High School Marching Band
 Carson High School Marching Band
 Colonial High School Marching Band
 De Anza High School Marching Band
 El Cajon High School Marching Band
 Freemont High School Marching Band
 Glendale School Marching Band
 Inglewood High School Marching Band
 John Muir High School Marching Band
 Lakewood High School Marching Band
 Long Beach All-District High School Marching Band
 Los Angeles Police Junior Band
 Mark Keppel High School Marching Band
 Mississippi Valley State College Marching Band
 Mutual Savings & Loan "Toppers" Band (Union Band)
 Oregon State University Marching Band
 Salvation Army Band
 Tournament of Roses Honor Band (Pasadena City College)
 United States Marine Corps Band
 University of Michigan Marching Band
 Valley High School Marching Band

1966 
 British Columbia Centennial Beefeater Band
 Tenri High School Marching Band
 Arcadia High School Marching Band
 Bakersfield College Marching Band
 Burbank All-City High School Marching Band
 Carbon High School Marching Band
 Castleberry High School Marching Band
 Durand Area High School Marching Band
 James Monroe High School Marching Band
 Klamath Union High School Marching Band
 Long Beach All-District High School Marching Band
 Michigan State University Marching Band
 Mount Miguel High School Marching Band
 Mutual Savings & Loan "Toppers" Band (Union Band)
 Sacramento City College Marching Band
 Salvation Army Band
 Sidney High School Marching Band
 South Gate City Youth Band
 St. Ann's Senior CYO Band
 Tournament of Roses Honor Band (Pasadena City College)
 United States Marine Corps Band
 University of California at Los Angeles Marching Band

1967 
 Arlington High School Marching Band
 Bucklin High School Marching Band
 Capuchino High School Marching Band
 Columbia High School Marching Band
 Dos Palos High School Marching Band
 El Cajon High School Marching Band
 Fifteenth Air Force Band
 Glendale School Marching Band
 Granada Hills High School Marching Band
 Independent Order of Foresters Marching Band
 Long Beach All-District High School Marching Band
 Montclair High School Marching Band
 Mutual Savings & Loan "Toppers" Band (Union Band)
 Porterville High School Marching Band
 Purdue University Marching Band
 Salvation Army Band
 Tooele High School Marching Band
 Tournament of Roses Honor Band (Pasadena City College)
 United States Marine Corps Band
 United States Navy Band
 University of Southern California Marching Band
 Whittier High School Marching Band

1968 
 Burbank All-City High School Marching Band
 Disneyland Band
 Eisenhower High School Marching Band
 Hapeville High School Marching Band
 Hilltop High School Marching Band
 Indiana University Marching Band
 Kalani High School Marching Band
 Long Beach All-District High School Marching Band
 Los Angeles Police Junior Band
 Mississippi Valley State College Marching Band
 Mutual Savings & Loan "Toppers" Band (Union Band)
 Phoenix Indian High School Marching Band
 Salvation Army Band
 Strategic Air Command Band Offutt AFB NE
 Taft High School Marching Band
 Tournament of Roses Honor Band (Pasadena City College)
 United States Continental Army Band
 United States Marine Corps Band
 University of Southern California Marching Band
 White Pine High School Marching Band
 Woodland High School Marching Band

1969 
 Beaver High School Marching Band
 Bernard Fire Department Band
 Buena High School Marching Band
 Charles M. Russell High School Marching Band
 Charleston High School Marching Band
 Glendale District Band
 Long Beach All-District High School Marching Band
 McDonald's All-American High School Marching Band
 Mount Miguel High School Marching Band
 Mutual Savings & Loan "Toppers" Band (Union Band)
 Prince George High School Marching Band
 Riverview High School Marching Band
 Rutgers University Marching Band
 Salvation Army Band
 The Ohio State University Marching Band
 Tournament of Roses Honor Band (Pasadena City College)
 United States 14th Army Band (Women's Army Corps)
 United States Marine Corps Band
 University of Southern California Marching Band
 West High School Marching Band
 Western States Army National Guard Band

1970 
 Burlington Teen Tour Band
 Alain LeRoy Locke High School Marching Band
 Arkansas City High School Marching Band
 Burbank All-City High School Marching Band
 Deer Park High School Marching Band
 La Crosse High School Marching Band
 Lakewood High School Marching Band
 Long Beach All-District High School Marching Band
 Marshalltown "Bobcat" Marching Band
 McDonald's All-American High School Marching Band
 Monarch High School Marching Band
 Mutual Savings & Loan "Toppers" Band (Union Band)
 Orangeburg High School Marching Band
 Port Chester High School Marching Band
 Salvation Army Band
 Santa Ana "Marching Saints" Santa Ana CA
 Tournament of Roses Honor Band (Pasadena City College)
 United States Marine Corps Band
 University of Michigan Marching Band
 University of Southern California Marching Band
 White Oak High School Marching Band

1971 
 C. E. King High School Marching Band
 Cupertino High School Marching Band
 Englewood High School Marching Band
 Glendale School Marching Band
 Glendora High School Marching Band
 Granada Hills High School Marching Band
 Hilo High School Marching Band
 Huntington High School Marching Band
 Leavenworth High School Marching Band
 Leland Stanford Junior University Marching Band
 Long Beach All-District High School Marching Band
 McDonald's All-American High School Marching Band
 Morris Brown College Marching Band
 Mount Miguel High School Marching Band
 Mutual Savings & Loan "Toppers" Band (Union Band)
 Plymouth Carver Regional High School Marching Band
 Salvation Army Band
 Santa Monica College Marching Band
 The Ohio State University Marching Band
 Tournament of Roses Honor Band (Pasadena City College)
 United States Marine Corps Band
 Massed Pipes and Drums
 Regina Lions Junior "A" Marching Band

1972 
 American Fork High School Marching Band
 Ben Davis High School Marching Band
 Burbank All-City High School Marching Band
 Charleston High School Marching Band
 Helix High School Marching Band
 John Marshall High School Marching Band
 Leland Stanford Junior University Marching Band
 Locke High School Marching Band
 Long Beach All-District High School Marching Band
 McDonald's All-American High School Marching Band
 Mutual Savings & Loan "Toppers" Band (Union Band)
 Newport Harbor High School Marching Band
 Plattsmouth High School Marching Band
 Salvation Army Band
 Seabreeze Marching 100
 Spring Branch High School Marching Band
 Tournament of Roses Honor Band (Pasadena City College)
 United States Marine Corps Band
 University of Michigan Marching Band
 Wauwatosa East High School Marching Band

1973 
 Massed Pipes and Drums
 Angleton High School Marching Band
 Arroyo High School Marching Band
 Cal Poly Pomona Marching Band
 Cary High School Marching Band
 Concord High School Marching Band
 Glendale School Marching Band
 Glendora High School Marching Band
 Long Beach All-District High School Marching Band
 Los Angeles Unified School District All-City Band
 McDonald's All-American High School Marching Band
 Memorial High School Marching Band
 Mutual Savings & Loan "Toppers" Band (Union Band)
 Orange Glen High School Marching Band
 Plymouth High School Marching Band
 Salvation Army Band
 Tenafly High School Marching Band
 The Ohio State University Marching Band
 Tournament of Roses Honor Band (Pasadena City College)
 United States Continental Army Band
 United States Marine Corps Band
 University of Southern California Marching Band

1974 
 Massed Pipes and Drums
 Arvada West High School Marching Band
 Belton High School Marching Band
 Burbank All-City High School Marching Band
 Christian County High School Marching Band
 Guymon High School Marching Band
 Katella High School Marching Band
 Long Beach All-District High School Marching Band
 Los Angeles Unified School District All-City Band
 McDonald's All-American High School Marching Band
 Mount Miguel High School Marching Band
 Richmond High School Marching Band
 Salvation Army Band
 Samuel Ayer High School Marching Band
 Shelton High School Shelton CT
 South Hadley High School Marching Band
 The Ohio State University Marching Band
 Thomas Jefferson High School Marching Band
 Tournament of Roses Honor Band (Pasadena City College)
 United States Marine Corps Band
 University of Southern California Marching Band

1975 
 All Ohio State Fair Youth Choir
 Arcadia High School Marching Band
 Butte High School Marching Band
 Clarke Central High School Marching Band
 Del Norte High School Marching Band
 Glendale School Marching Band
 John Hersey High School Marching Band
 Kearns High School Marching Band
 Long Beach All-District High School Marching Band
 Los Angeles Unified School District All-City Band
 McDonald's All-American High School Marching Band
 Mount Miguel High School Marching Band
 Navajo Nation Marching Band
 Orange Glen High School Marching Band
 Salvation Army Band
 Shorecrest High School Marching Band
 Sunnyvale High School Marching Band
 The Ohio State University Marching Band
 Tournament of Roses Honor Band (Pasadena City College)
 United States Marine Corps Band
 University of Southern California Marching Band
 West High School Marching Band

1976 
 All-Canada Pipers Band - "Scarlet and Brass" Band
 Municipal Band of the City of Geneva Geneva Switzerland
 Armijo High School Marching Band
 Burbank All-City High School Marching Band
 Dodge City High School Marching Band
 Freedom High School Marching Band
 Jefferson City High School Marching Jay Band
 Lakewood High School Marching Band
 Long Prairie High School Marching Band
 Los Altos High School Marching Band
 Los Angeles Unified School District All-City Band
 McDonald's All-American High School Marching Band
 Mount Vernon High School Marching Band
 Salvation Army Band
 San Pasqual High School Marching Band
 St. Albans High School Marching Band
 The Ohio State University Marching Band
 Tournament of Roses Honor Band (Pasadena City College)
 United States Marine Corps Band
 University of California at Los Angeles Marching Band
 US Army 3rd Infantry (Old Guard) Fife and Drum Corps
 Vista High School Marching Band

1977 
 Bullard High School Marching Band
 California State University, Long Beach "Big Brown Music Machine" Marching Band
 Cary High School Marching Band
 Concord High School Marching Band
 Estancia High School Marching Band
 Fairview High School Marching Band
 Glendora High School Marching Band
 Helix High School Marching Band
 John Marshall High School Marching Band
 Lawrenceburg High School Marching Band
 Live Oak High School Marching Band
 Los Angeles Unified School District All-City Band
 McDonald's All-American High School Marching Band
 Mount Miguel High School Marching Band
 Pacifica High School Marching Band
 Pasadena High School Marching Band
 Salvation Army Band
 Tournament of Roses Honor Band (Pasadena City College)
 Union-Endicott High School Marching Band
 United States Marine Corps Band
 University of Michigan Marching Band
 University of Southern California Marching Band

1978 
 Adlai E. Stevenson High School Marching Band
 All Ohio State Fair Youth Choir
 Centennial High School Marching Band
 Chambersburg Area High School Marching Band
 Colton High School Marching Band
 Fort Walton Beach High School Marching Band
 Hellgate High School Marching Band
 Independence High School Marching Band
 Los Altos High School Marching Band
 Los Angeles Unified School District All-City Band
 McDonald's All-American High School Marching Band
 Paradise Valley High School Marching Band
 Poway High School Marching Band
 Roosevelt High School Marching Band
 Ruskin High School Marching Band
 Salvation Army Band
 Spring Hill High High School Marching Band
 Tournament of Roses Honor Band (Pasadena City College)
 United States Marine Corps Band
 University of Michigan Marching Band
 University of Washington Marching Band

1979 
 Ontario Massed Legion of Pipes and Drums
 Arcadia High School Marching Band
 Aurora High School Marching Band
 Ben Davis High School Marching Band
 Foothill High School Marching Band
 Glen A. Wilson High School Marching Band
 Glenbrook South High School Marching Band
 Huntington High School Marching Band
 Kamehameha Schools Marching Band
 Los Angeles Unified School District All-City Band
 McDonald's All-American High School Marching Band
 McGavock High School Marching Band
 Mount Miguel High School Marching Band
 Pampa High School Marching Band
 Salvation Army Band
 Tournament of Roses Honor Band (Pasadena City College)
 Tulare Union High School Marching Band
 United States Air Force Academy Band
 United States Marine Corps Band
 University of Michigan Marching Band
 University of Southern California Marching Band
 West High School Marching Band
 Winter Haven High School Marching Band

1980 
 All Nations American Indian Band Various
 All Ohio State Fair Youth Choir
 Burlington Teen Tour Band
 Century High School Marching Band
 Colton High School Marching Band
 Conestoga Senior High School Marching Band
 Englewood High School Marching Band
 Fairfield High School Marching Band
 Glendora High School Marching Band
 Helix High School Marching Band
 Huntington Beach High School Marching Band
 Los Altos High School Marching Band
 Los Angeles Unified School District All-City Band
 McDonald's All-American High School Marching Band
 Pearl City High School Marching Band
 Riverview High School Marching Band
 Salvation Army Band
 Southern University Marching Band
 The Ohio State University Marching Band (Rose Bowl participant)
 Thomas Jefferson High School Marching Band
 Tournament of Roses Honor Band (Pasadena City College)
 United States Marine Corps Band
 University of Southern California Marching Band (Rose Bowl participant)
 Westchester High School Marching Band

1981 
 Acadiana High School Marching Band
 Arcadia High School Marching Band
 Cardozo High School Marching Band
 Carrollton High School Trojan Marching Band
 Defiance High School Marching Band
 Douglas County High School Marching Band
 Edison High School Marching Band
 Glen A. Wilson High School Marching Band
 Harlingen High School Marching Band
 Hibbing High School Marching Band
 Kahuku High School Marching Band
 Kanto Gakuin High School Yokohama Japan
 Liberal High School Marching Band
 Los Angeles Unified School District All-City Band
 Mead High School Marching Band
 Ontario Massed Legion of Pipes and Drums
 Pasadena City College Swing Choir
 Poway High School Marching Band
 Salvation Army Band
 San Jose State University Marching Band
 Tournament of Roses Honor Band (Pasadena City College)
 United States Marine Corps Band
 University of Michigan Marching Band (Rose Bowl participant)
 University of Washington Marching Band (Rose Bowl participant)

1982 
 1st Canadian Regiment Drum & Bugle Corps
 Antelope Valley High School Marching Band
 Arcadia High School Marching Band
 Blue Springs High School Marching Band
 Bonnabel Senior High School Marching Band
 Dennis-Yarmouth High School Marching Band
 Jackson High School Marching Band
 Kalani High School Marching Band
 Lincoln-Way Community High School Marching Band
 Los Angeles Unified School District All-City Band
 McDonald's All-American High School Marching Band
 Midland High School Marching Band
 Mount Miguel High School Marching Band
 Northern Lebanon High School Marching Band
 Orange Glen High School Marching Band
 Palo Verde High School Marching Band
 Porterville High School Marching Band
 Salvation Army Band
 Tournament of Roses Honor Band (Pasadena City College)
 United States Marine Corps Band
 University of Iowa Marching Band (Rose Bowl participant)
 University of Washington Marching Band (Rose Bowl participant)

1983 
 Buena High School Marching Band
 Concord High School Marching Band
 East Hall High School Marching Band
 Elko High School Marching Band
 Freedom High School Marching Band
 Independence High School Marching Band
 Jonesboro High School Marching Band
 Jones Junior College Marching Band
 Leavenworth High School Marching Band
 Los Altos High School Marching Band
 Los Angeles Unified School District All-City Band
 Magnolia High School Marching Band
 Marshall County High School Marching Band
 McDonald's All-American High School Marching Band
 Monticello High School Marching Band
 Patrick Henry Patriot Marching Band
 Salvation Army Band
 Tournament of Roses Honor Band (Pasadena City College)
 United States Air Force Academy Band
 United States Continental Army Band
 United States Marine Corps Band
 University of California at Los Angeles Marching Band (Rose Bowl participant)
 University of Michigan Marching Band (Rose Bowl participant)

1984 
 Allen High School Marching Band
 Cary High School Marching Band
 Espanola Valley High School Marching Band
 Glencoe High School Marching Band
 Glendora High School Marching Band
 Homewood High School Marching Band
 John S. Battle High School Marching Band
 John W. North High School Marching Band
 Los Angeles Unified School District All-City Band
 Mater Dei High School Marching Band
 McDonald's All-American High School Marching Band
 Missoula High School Marching Band
 Montebello High School Marching Band
 Mt. Carmel High School Marching Band
 Newcastle & Hunter Region Combined High School Marching Band
 Newton Community High School Marching Band
 Pearl City High School Marching Band
 Round Rock High School Marching Band
 Salvation Army Band
 Tournament of Roses Honor Band (Pasadena City College)
 Tulare Union High School Marching Band
 United States Marine Corps Band
 University of California at Los Angeles Marching Band (Rose Bowl participant)
 University of Illinois Marching Band (Rose Bowl participant)

1985 
 Arcadia High School Marching Band
 Auburn High School Marching Band
 Ben Davis High School Marching Band
 Colton High School Marching Band
 El Toro High School Marching Band
 Foothill High School Marching Band
 Lakeland High School Marching Band
 Los Angeles Unified School District All-City Band
 McDonald's All-American High School Marching Band
 Midland High School Marching Band
 Musique Municipale de la Ville De Geneve Geneva Switzerland
 Owasso High School Marching Band
 Poway High School Marching Band
 Punahou High School Marching Band
 Salvation Army Band
 The Ohio State University Marching Band (Rose Bowl participant)
 Tournament of Roses Honor Band (Pasadena City College)
 Troopers Drum & Bugle Corps
 Union City High School Marching Band
 United States Marine Corps Band
 University of Southern California Marching Band (Rose Bowl participant)
 Vista High School Marching Band

1986 
 British Columbia Centennial Beefeater Band
 Clovis High School Marching Band
 Conroe High School Marching Band
 Glen A. Wilson High School Marching Band
 Jamestown High School Marching Band
 Las Cruces High School Marching Band
 Los Angeles Unified School District All-City Band
 McDonald's All-American High School Marching Band
 Miliani High School Marching Band
 Patrick Henry Patriot Marching Band
 Pennsbury High School Marching Band
 Porterville High School Marching Band
 Prospect High School Marching Band
 Rockford High School Marching Band
 Salvation Army Band
 Tate High School Marching Band
 Thomas Jefferson High School Marching Band
 Tournament of Roses Honor Band (Pasadena City College)
 Ukiah High School Marching Band
 United States Marine Corps Band
 University of California at Los Angeles Marching Band (Rose Bowl participant)
 University of Iowa Marching Band (Rose Bowl participant)

1987 
 Arizona State University Marching Band (Rose Bowl participant)
 Boardman High School Marching Band
 Burlington Teen Tour Band
 Forest Lake High School Marching Band
 Harlingen High School Marching Band
 Holland High School Marching Band
 John Overton High School Marching Band
 Lincoln High School Marching Band
 Los Angeles Unified School District All-City Band
 McDonald's All-American High School Marching Band
 Missoula High School Marching Band
 Notre Dame High School Marching Band
 Riverview High School Marching Band
 Rocky Mount High School Marching Band
 Royal Jordanian Armed Forces Band
 Saint Louis High School Marching Band
 Salvation Army Band
 Stevens High School Marching Band
 Suzu Vocational High School Marching Band
 Tournament of Roses Honor Band (Pasadena City College)
 United States Marine Corps Band
 United Way Marching Band
 University of Michigan Marching Band (Rose Bowl participant)

1988 
 Blackstone-Millville Junior/Senior High School Marching Band
 Castle High School Marching Band
 Choctawhatchee High School Marching Band
 Jefferson City High School Marching Band
 Lassiter High School Marching Band
 Los Angeles Unified School District All-City Band
 Michigan State University Marching Band (Rose Bowl participant)
 Mt. Carmel High School Marching Band
 Northrop High School Marching Band
 Oak Grove High School Marching Band
 O'Fallon Township High School Marching Band
 Overland High School Marching Band
 Pella Community High School Marching Band
 Salvation Army Band
 Toms River High School South Marching Band
 Tournament of Roses Honor Band (Pasadena City College)
 Tulare Union High School Marching Band
 United States Marine Corps Band
 University of Southern California Marching Band (Rose Bowl participant)
 Vallejo High School Marching Band

1989 
 Arcadia High School Marching Band
 Auburn High School Marching Band
 Carrollton High School Trojan Marching Band
 Duncanville High School Marching Band
 Freedom High School Marching Band
 Huntington High School Marching Band
 Kamehameha Schools Marching Band
 Kanto Gakuin High School Marching Band
 Los Angeles Unified School District All-City Band
 McDonald's All-American High School Marching Band
 Mt. View High School Marching Band
 North Dakota High School Marching Band
 Ontario Massed Legion of Pipes and Drums
 Owasso High School Marching Band
 Porterville High School Marching Band
 Poway High School Marching Band
 Salvation Army Band
 Strongsville High School Marching Band
 Tournament of Roses Honor Band (Pasadena City College)
 United States Marine Corps Band
 University of Michigan Marching Band (Rose Bowl participant)
 University of Southern California Marching Band (Rose Bowl participant)
 Westview High School Marching Band

1990 
 Alexis I. DuPont High School Marching Band
 Castle Park High School Marching Band
 Cicero-North Syracuse High School Marching Band
 Cooper High School Marching Band
 East Carteret High School Marching Band
 Grove City High School Marching Band
 House of Sampoerna Marching Band
 Jefferson High School Marching Band
 Los Angeles Unified School District All-City Band
 Merced High School Marching Band
 Missoula High School Marching Band
 Moanalua High School Marching Band
 Red Lion Inns' Marching Band (One More Time Around Again Band)
 Riverside Community College Marching Band
 Salvation Army Band
 Santa Ana Winds Youth Band Santa Ana CA
 Tenri-Kyo High School Band - Tenri Seminary High School Tenri, Nara Japan
 Tournament of Roses Honor Band (Pasadena City College)
 United States Marine Corps Band
 University of Michigan Marching Band (Rose Bowl participant)
 University of Southern California Marching Band (Rose Bowl participant)
 Zurich City Police Band Zurich Switzerland

1991 
 Aloha High School Marching Band
 Ben Davis High School Marching Band
 Clovis High School Marching Band
 House of Sampoerna Marching Band
 Los Angeles Unified School District All-City Band
 Metallharmonie St. Otmar/St. Gallen Waldkirch/SG Switzerland
 Normal Community High School Marching Band
 Norwalk High School Marching Band
 Olathe North High School Marching Band
 Patriots of Northern Virginia Colonial Regiment Arlington VA
 Salvation Army Band
 Shinagawa High School Marching Band (Girls school)
 Shorecrest High School Marching Band
 Tournament of Roses Honor Band (Pasadena City College)
 United States Coast Guard Band & Precision Drill Team
 United States Marine Corps Band
 University of Iowa Marching Band (Rose Bowl participant)
 University of Washington Marching Band (Rose Bowl participant)
 Upland High School Marching Band
 Vallejo High School Marching Band
 Vero Beach High School Marching Band
 Wyoming All-State High School Band

1992 
 Air Academy High School Marching Band
 Carlisle High School Marching Band
 Desoto High School Marching Band
 Foothill High School Marching Band
 Forest Lake High School Marching Band
 Hemet High School Marching Band
 Hilo High School Marching Band
 Kendrick High School Marching Band
 Kickapoo High School Marching Band
 Lincoln High School Marching Band
 Londonderry High School Marching Band
 Los Angeles Unified School District All-City Band
 Marshall County High School Marching Band
 Salvation Army Band
 Springfield High School Marching Band
 Tournament of Roses Honor Band (Pasadena City College)
 United States Marine Corps Band (Rose Bowl participant)
 University of Michigan Marching Band
 University of Washington Marching Band (Rose Bowl participant)
 West High School Marching Band

1993 
 Arcadia High School Marching Band
 Blue Springs High School Marching Band
 Castle Park High School Marching Band
 Diamond Bar High School Marching Band
 Gilbert High School Marching Band
 Hermitage High School Marching Band
 Hunter Region High School Marching Band
 Lincoln High School Marching Band
 Los Angeles Unified School District All-City Band
 Maurice-Orange City High School Marching Band
 Mercer Island High School Marching Band
 Osaka Federation High School Honor Band Osaka Japan
 Pickerington High School Marching Band
 Robert E. Lee High School Marching Band
 Salvation Army Band
 Sprayberry High School Marching Band
 Tournament of Roses Honor Band (Pasadena City College)
 United States Marine Corps Band
 University of Michigan Marching Band (Rose Bowl participant)
 University of Washington Marching Band (Rose Bowl participant)
 Westbrook High School Marching Band

1994 
 Canadian Massed Pipes and Drums
 Comeaux High School Marching Band
 Deer Valley High School Marching Band
 Easton Area High School Marching Band
 Fairfield High School Marching Band
 Haukerod, Fevang & Krokemoa, Sandefjord Haukerod Skolekorps Sandefjord Norway
 Hermiston High School Marching Band
 Kahuku High School Marching Band
 Lincoln Northeast High School Marching Band
 Los Angeles Unified School District All-City Band
 Musashino Gakuin High School Marching Band
 Northrop High School Marching Band
 Pipestone High School Marching Band
 Port Washington High School Marching Band
 Rancho Bernardo High School
 Salvation Army Band
 Taipei First Girl High School Taipei Taiwan
 Tournament of Roses Honor Band (Pasadena City College)
 United States Marine Corps Band
 University of California at Los Angeles Marching Band (Rose Bowl participant)
 University of Wisconsin Marching Band (Rose Bowl participant)
 Walterboro High School Marching Band
 Willowridge High School Marching Band

1995 
 Alexis I. DuPont High School Marching Band
 Elko High School Marching Band
 Ferndale High School Marching Band
 Fort Mill High School Marching Band
 Greenville High School Marching Band
 Holland High School Marching Band
 Los Angeles Unified School District All-City Band
 Meijo Gakuin High School Marching Band
 Moanalua High School Marching Band
 Morris Brown College Marching Band
 Newton High School Marching Band
 Owasso High School Marching Band
 Penn State University Marching Blue Band (Rose Bowl participant)
 Polizei Musik Basel Switzerland
 Poway High School Marching Band
 Salvation Army Band
 Southwest Missouri State University Marching Band
 Tournament of Roses Honor Band (Pasadena City College)
 United States Marine Corps Band
 University of Oregon Marching Band (Rose Bowl participant)
 Waukesha North High School Marching Band
 West High School Marching Band

1996 
 Blue Springs High School Marching Band
 Dartmouth High School Marching Band
 Etiwanda High School Marching Band
 Franklin High School Marching Band
 Henry Ford II Falcon High School Marching Band
 Jones Junior College Marching Band
 Leander High School Marching Band
 Los Angeles Unified School District All-City Band
 Monache High School Marching Band
 Muhomet-Seymour High School Marching Band
 Nishihara High School Marching Band
 Northwestern University Marching Band (Rose Bowl participant)
 Parkway Central High School Marching Band
 Pearl City High School Marching Band
 Pomona High School Marching Band
 Royal British Legion Youth Band
 Salvation Army Band
 Taipei First Girl High School Taipei Taiwan
 Tate High School Marching Band
 Tournament of Roses Honor Band (Pasadena City College)
 United States Marine Corps Band
 University of Southern California Marching Band (Rose Bowl participant)
 Westwood High School Marching Band

1997 
 Arizona State University Marching Band (Rose Bowl participant)
 Calgary Stampede Show Band
 Colony High School Marching Band
 Denver Citywide Marching Band (composite of 10)
 Iolani High School Marching Band
 Joel E. Ferris High School Marching Band
 Londonderry High School Marching Band
 Los Angeles Unified School District All-City Band
 Newman High School Marching Band
 North Allegheny High School Marching Band
 North Park Middle School Marching Band
 O'Fallon Township High School Marching Band
 Ondine Genevoise Geneva Switzerland
 Pickerington High School Marching Band
 Riverside Community College Marching Band
 Salvation Army Band
 Scottsboro High School Marching Band
 The Ohio State University Marching Band (Rose Bowl participant)
 Tournament of Roses Honor Band (Pasadena City College)
 United States Marine Corps Band

1998 
 Alexandria-Jefferson High School Marching Band
 American Fork High School Marching Band
 Arcadia High School Marching Band
 Derby High School Marching Band
 Foothill High School Marching Band
 Grenada High School Marching Band
 Jackson High School Marching Band
 Jefferson High School Marching Band
 Lincoln High School Marching Band
 Los Angeles Unified School District All-City Band
 Mililani High School Marching Band
 Monfort College Band & Assumption College Marching Band
 Salvation Army Band
 Sumner High School Marching Band
 Tournament of Roses Honor Band (Pasadena City College)
 United States Marine Corps Band
 University High School Marching Band
 University of Michigan Marching Band (Rose Bowl participant)
 Washington State University Marching Band (Rose Bowl participant)
 Washington Township High School Marching Band
 Yorkton Regional High School Yorkton, Saskatchewan Canada

1999 
 Alexis I. DuPont High School Marching Band
 Bloomington High School Marching Band
 Blue Springs High School Marching Band
 Bozeman High School Marching Band
 Cheshire High School Marching Band
 Cy-Fair High School Marching Band
 Defiance High School Marching Band
 Elko High School Marching Band
 Lincoln High School Marching Band
 Los Angeles Unified School District All-City Band
 Marjory Stoneman Douglas High School Marching Band
 Punahou High School Marching Band
 Salvation Army Band
 Science High School Marching Band
 Tempe High School Marching Band
 Thousand Oaks High School Marching Band
 Tournament of Roses Honor Band (Pasadena City College)
 United States Marine Corps Band
 University of California at Los Angeles Marching Band (Rose Bowl participant)
 University of Wisconsin Marching Band (Rose Bowl participant)

2000 
 Arcadia High School Marching Band
 Butler High School Marching Band
 East Fairmont High School Marching Band
 Fairfield High School Marching Band
 Grove City High School Marching Band
 James F. Byrnes High School Marching Band
 Kashiwa Municipal High School Marching Band
 Leland Stanford Junior University Marching Band (Rose Bowl participant)
 Lincoln-Way Community High School Marching Band
 Los Angeles Unified School District All-City Band
 Mayfield High School Marching Band
 Mead & Mt. Spokane High School Marching Band
 Pearl City High School Marching Band
 Pflugerville High School Marching Band
 Reedley High School Marching Band
 Salvation Army Band
 Tournament of Roses Honor Band (Pasadena City College)
 United States Marine Corps Band
 University of Wisconsin Marching Band (Rose Bowl participant)
 Wyoming All-State High School Band

2001 
 Ashwaubenon High School Marching Band
 Banda Escolar de Guayanilla Guayanilla Puerto Rico
 Benicia High School Marching Band
 Coppell High School Marching Band
 Danvers High School Marching Band
 Diamond Bar High School Marching Band
 Downingtown High School Marching Band
 Glendora High School Marching Band
 Highland High School Marching Band
 Jamestown High School Marching Band
 Joplin High School Marching Band
 Lassiter High School Marching Band
 Los Angeles Unified School District All-City Band
 Penn High School Marching Band
 Purdue University Marching Band (Rose Bowl participant)
 Rancho Bernardo High School Marching Band
 Salem High School Marching Band
 Salvation Army Band
 Spruce Creek High School Marching Band
 Tournament of Roses Honor Band (Pasadena City College)
 United States Marine Corps Band
 University of Washington Marching Band (Rose Bowl participant)
 Zurich City Police Band Zurich Switzerland

2002 
 Blue Springs High School Marching Band
 Chino High School Marching Band
 Christ's Hospital Band, Christ's Hospital School
 Columbine High School Marching Band
 De Soto High School Marching Band
 Detroit Public Schools All-City Marching Band
 Dobyns-Bennett High School Marching Band
 Frank Scott Bunnell High School Marching Band
 Kamehameha Schools Marching Band
 Kennewick High School Marching Band
 Los Angeles Unified School District All-City Band
 Marist High School Marching Band
 Salvation Army Band
 St. Augustine High School Marching Band
 Stephenson High School Marching Band
 Strongsville High School Marching Band
 Tournament of Roses Honor Band (Pasadena City College)
 Union High School Marching Band
 United States Marine Corps Band
 University of Miami Marching Band (Rose Bowl participant)
 University of Nebraska Marching Band (Rose Bowl participant)
 Waukesha North High School Marching Band

2003 
 All-Shiga High School Marching Band
 Arcadia High School Marching Band
 Attica Senior High School Marching Band
 Calgary Stampede Show Band
 Davis High High School Marching Band
 Homestead High School Marching Band
 Homewood High School Marching Band
 James Logan High School Marching Band
 Lexington High School Marching Band
 Los Angeles Unified School District All-City Band
 Mountain View High School Marching Band
 North Royalton High School Marching Band
 Pella Community High School Marching Band
 Rancho Buena Vista High School Marching Band
 Salvation Army Band
 South Dakota State University Marching Band
 Tournament of Roses Honor Band (Pasadena City College)
 United States Marine Corps Band
 University of Oklahoma Marching Band (Rose Bowl participant)
 Walton High School Marching Band
 Washington State University Marching Band (Rose Bowl participant)
 Westlake High School Marching Band

2004 
 Aguiluchos Marching Band-Puebla México 
 Alexis I. DuPont High School Marching Band
 Ambridge Area High School Marching Band
 Central Carroll High School Marching Band
 Clark County High School Marching Band
 Columbus North High School Marching Band
 Idaho High School Marching Band
 Londonderry High School Marching Band
 Los Angeles Unified School District All-City Band
 Odessa-Permian Composite High School Marching Band
 Owasso High School Marching Band
 Riverside Community College Marching Band
 Salvation Army Band
 Santa Clara Vanguard Drum & Bugle Corps
 Temple City High School Marching Band
 Tournament of Roses Honor Band (Pasadena City College)
 United States Air Force Academy Band
 United States Marine Corps Band
 University of Michigan Marching Band (Rose Bowl participant)
 University of Southern California Marching Band (Rose Bowl participant)
 Valley High School Marching Band

2005 
 Bands of America Honor Band
 Benicia High School Marching Band
 Conservatorio de las Artes Marching Band
 El Dorado High School Marching Band
 Hellgate High School Marching Band
 Hempfield High School Marching Band
 Kaua'i "Ku Kilakila" All Island Marching Band
 Lassiter High School Marching Band
 Lawrence High School Marching Band
 Lincoln High School Marching Band
 Lindbergh High School Marching Band
 Los Angeles Unified School District All-City Band
 North Park Middle School Marching Band
 Oswego High School Marching Band
 Pasadena Unified School District All-Star Band
 Pomona High School Marching Band
 Salvation Army Band
 Seminole High School Marching Band
 Taipei First Girl High School Taipei Taiwan
 Tournament of Roses Honor Band (Pasadena City College)
 United States Marine Corps Band
 University of Michigan Marching Band (Rose Bowl participant)
 University of Texas Marching Band (Rose Bowl participant)
 Winston Churchill High School Marching Band

2006 
 Alabama A&M University Marching Band
 Allen Eagle High School Marching Band
 Banda de Musica de la Wescuela Secundaria #22 Sonora Mexico
 Ben Davis High School Marching Band
 Canadian Massed Pipes and Drums
 Danvers High School Marching Band
 Fayetteville High School Marching Band
 Foothill High School Marching Band
 Hoover High School Marching Band
 Los Angeles Unified School District All-City Band
 Lowndes High School Marching Band
 Mercer Island High School Marching Band
 Mt. Carmel High School Marching Band
 Pasadena Unified School District All-Star Band
 Pearl City High School Marching Band
 Pickerington High School Marching Band
 Prospect High School Marching Band
 Salvation Army Band
 Seika Girls High School Marching Band
 Southwest DeKalb High School Marching Band
 Tournament of Roses Honor Band (Pasadena City College)
 United States Marine Corps Band
 University of Southern California Marching Band (Rose Bowl participant)
 University of Texas Marching Band (Rose Bowl participant)
 Webb City High School Marching Band

2007 
 Australian Southern Stars Marching Band
 Butler High School Marching Band
 Delfines Marching Band Vera Cruz Mexico
 Dobyns-Bennett High School Marching Band
 Fayette County High School Marching Band
 Grambling State University Marching Band (Star Wars Spectacular, band dressed as Storm Troopers)
 Kingwood High School Marching Band
 Lakeville North High School Marching Band
 Los Angeles Unified School District All-City Band
 Louisiana Leadership Institute High School Marching Band
 Mountain Ridge High School Marching Band
 Oklahoma All-Star Centennial Marching Band
 Porterville High School Marching Band
 Pulaski High School Marching Band
 Punahou High School Marching Band
 Riverside King High School Marching Band
 Salvation Army Band
 Tournament of Roses Honor Band (Pasadena City College)
 United States Marine Corps Band
 University of Michigan Marching Band (Rose Bowl participant)
 University of Southern California Marching Band (Rose Bowl participant)
 Waukesha North High School Marching Band

2008 
 Akashikita High School Marching Band
 Alexis I. DuPont High School Marching Band
 All Kamehameha Schools High School Marching Band
 Arcadia High School Marching Band
 Lakota West High School Marching Band
 Los Angeles Unified School District All-City Band
 Missouri State University Pride Marching Band
 Nacogdoches High School Marching Band
 Needham B. Broughton High School Marching Band
 Niceville High School Marching Band
 Nuestros Angeles de El Salvador
 Salvation Army Band
 South Dakota State University Marching Band
 The Banda Escolar de Guayanilla
 Tournament of Roses Honor Band
 United States Marine Corps Band
 University of Illinois Marching Band (Rose Bowl participant)
 University of Southern California Marching Band (Rose Bowl participant)
 Virginia Military Institute Regimental Band and Pipe Band

2009
 Aguilas Doradas Marching Band, Puebla, Mexico 
 Alhambra Unified School District Band
 Ballou Senior High School Band
 Blue Springs High School Golden Regiment Marching Band
 Broken Arrow High School
 Golden Valley High School
 Hawaii All-State Marching Band
 Homewood Patriot Marching Band, Homewood, Alabama
 Honor Band of America
 Liberty High School Grenadier Band (Bethlehem, Pennsylvania)
 Los Angeles Unified All-District Honor Band
 McQueen High School Band
 Pasadena City College Tournament of Roses Honor Band
 Penn State University Marching Blue Band (Rose Bowl participant)
 Prairie View A&M University
 Riverside Community College Marching Tiger Band
 The Royal British Legion Youth Band Brentwood
 The Salvation Army Tournament of Roses Band
 Science Hill High School
 U.S. Marine Corps West Coast Composite Band
 University of Southern California Trojan Marching Band (Rose Bowl participant)

2010
 Banda Musical Latina Pedro Molina (Guatemala)
 Conroe High School (Texas) Tiger Band
 Danvers High School (Massachusetts) Falcon Marching Band
 El Dorado High School (Placentia, California) Golden Hawks
 Farmers' Marching Band (First band on the parade line up) RCC Marching Tigers
 Glendora Tartan Band and Pageantry
 Kansai Green Honor Band (Kansai, Japan)
 Los Angeles Unified School District All District High School Honor Band
 The Marian Catholic High School band
 Millard West High School (Omaha, Nebraska)
The Ohio State University Marching Band (Rose Bowl participant) 
 The Ohio State School for the Marching Blind Band (Second band on the parade line up)
 The Ohio University Marching 110 Band
 Oregon Marching Band (Rose Bowl participant)
 Pasadena City College Tournament of Roses Honor Band
 Pickerington Central (Ohio) Marching Tiger Band
 Salvation Army Tournament of Roses Band
 Soddy Daisy High School (Tennessee) Marching Band
 South Kitsap High School (Washington)
 United States Marine Corps West Coast Composite Band
 George Walton Comprehensive High School (Georgia)
 Webb City High School (Missouri)

2011
 Albertville High School (Alabama) Aggie Band
 All-Birdville Independent School District Band (Texas), Including the Richland High School Rebel Marching Band, the Pride of Haltom High School Buffalo Band, and the Birdville High School Mighty Hawk Band.
 Banda Musical Delfines, Xalapa, Veracruz, Mexico
 CDF Firefighters Honor Guard Pipes & Drums, Sacramento, California
 Central-Carroll High School Marching Pride (Carrollton, Georgia)
 Downingtown High School (Pennsylvania) Blue & Gold Marching Band
 Lindbergh High School's Spirit of St. Louis Marching Band
 Londonderry High School Marching Band and Colorguard (New Hampshire)
 LAUSD All District High School Honor Band 
 North Carolina Central University (NCCU) Sound Machine
 North Japan Honor Green Band, Japan
 Owasso High School Pride of Owasso Band, Owasso, Oklahoma
 Pasadena City College Tournament of Roses Honor Band and Herald Trumpets
 The Salvation Army Tournament of Roses Band 
 Southwest DeKalb High School Marching Panthers
 Texas Christian University Marching Band (Rose Bowl participant)
 University of Wisconsin Marching Band (Rose Bowl participant)
 Upland High School (California) Highland Regiment
 U.S. Marine Corps West Coast Composite Band
 Western Carolina University Pride of the Mountains Marching Band
 Wyoming High School All State Marching Band

2012
 American Fork High School Marching Band, American Fork, Utah
 Arcadia High School Apache Marching Band and Color Guard, Arcadia, California
 Avon (High School) Marching Black & Gold, Avon, Indiana
 Banda Escolar de Guayanilla (Guayanilla, Puerto Rico)
 Needham B. Broughton High School Band, Raleigh, North Carolina
 Calgary Stampede Showband (Calgary, Alberta, Canada)
 Crestview High School 'The Big Red Machine' Band, Crestview, Florida
 Ben Davis High School Marching Giants Band, Indianapolis, Indiana
 Franklin Regional High School Marching Band, Murrysville, Pennsylvania
 Kyoto Tachibana High School Green Band (Kyoto, Japan) 
 LAUSD All District High School Honor Band, Los Angeles, California
 All Lubbock ISD High School Marching Band (Lubbock High School, Monterey High School, Coronado High School and Estacado High School), Lubbock, Texas
 Mercer Island High School Marching Band, Mercer Island, Washington
 University of Oregon Marching Band, Eugene, Oregon (Rose Bowl participant)
 Pasadena City College Tournament of Roses Honor Band and Herald Trumpets, Pasadena, California
 Pulaski High School Red Raider Marching Band, Pulaski, Wisconsin
 The Royal Swedish Navy Cadet Band, Karlskrona, Sweden
 Salvation Army Tournament of Roses Band
 Siloam Springs High School Band, Siloam Springs, Arkansas
 United States Marine Corps West Coast Composite Band
 University of Wisconsin Marching Band, Madison, Wisconsin (Rose Bowl participant)

2013 (124th)
 Aguiluchos Marching Band, Puebla, Mexico
 Bands of America Honor Band, Indianapolis, Indiana 
 Broken Arrow High School, Pride of Broken Arrow Marching Band, Broken Arrow, Oklahoma
 Davis High School Marching Band, Kaysville, Utah
 Green Band Association, All Izumo Honor Green Band – Izumo, Japan
 Jackson Memorial High School Jaguar Marching Band, Jackson, New Jersey
 Lafayette High School Marching Band, Lexington, Kentucky
 Lassiter High School Marching Band, Marietta, Georgia
 Lincoln High School, Sioux Falls, South Dakota
 LAUSD All District High School Honor Band, Los Angeles, California
 MOC-Floyd Valley High School Pride of the Dutchmen Marching Band, Orange City, Iowa 
 Morgantown High School Red & Blue Marching Band, Morgantown, West Virginia
 Pacific American Volunteer Association (PAVA) – Yi Dynasty, Los Angeles, California
 Pasadena City College Tournament of Roses Honor Band and Herald Trumpets, Pasadena, California
 Peace Band of our Angels of El Salvador, San Salvador, El Salvador
 Roots of Music Marching Crusaders, New Orleans, Louisiana
 Salvation Army Tournament of Roses Band, Los Angeles, California
 Santiago High School Marching Band and Color Guard, Corona, California
 Seminole High School Seminole Warhawk Marching Band, Seminole, Florida
 Leland Stanford Junior University Marching Band, Stanford, California (Rose Bowl participant)
 U.S. Marine Corps West Coast Composite Band
 Valley Christian High School East-West Fusion All-Star Band (with No. 57 School from Beijing), San Jose, California and Beijing, China
 University of Wisconsin Marching Band, Madison, Wisconsin (Rose Bowl participant)

2014 (125th)
 Banda de Música Herberto López Colegio José Daniel Crespo, Herrera, Panamá
Carmel High School “Marching Greyhounds,” Carmel, Indiana
 Colony High School Knights Marching Band “THEE Northern Sound,” Palmer, Alaska
 Dobyns-Bennett High School Marching Indian Band, Kingsport, Tennessee
 Glendora High School Tartan Band and Pageantry, Glendora, California
 Hawaii All State Marching Band "Na Koa Ali'i," Kaneohe, Hawaii
Homewood High School Patriot Marching Band, Homewood, Alabama
 Claudia Taylor "Lady Bird" Johnson High School Marching Band, San Antonio, Texas
Liberty High School Grenadier Band, Bethlehem, Pennsylvania
 LAUSD All District High School Honor Band, Los Angeles, California
 McQueen High School “Lancer Band,” Reno, Nevada
 Michigan State University Spartan Marching Band, East Lansing, Michigan (Rose Bowl participant)
 Nagoya Minami High School Green Band, Nagoya, Japan
 Pasadena City College Tournament of Roses Honor Band and Herald Trumpets, Pasadena, California (85th Rose Parade appearance in 2014)
 St. Augustine High School Marching “100,” New Orleans, Louisiana
 The Salvation Army Tournament of Roses Band, Los Angeles, California (95th year of participation in 2014)
 Leland Stanford Junior University Marching Band, Stanford, California (Rose Bowl participant)
Rosemount High School Marching Band, Rosemount, Minnesota
 United States Marine Corps West Coast Composite Band
 Westfield High School Marching Bulldogs, Chantilly, Virginia

2015 (126th)
 Blue Springs High School Golden Regiment Marching Band, Blue Springs, Missouri
Cavalcade of Bands Honor Band, Mid-Atlantic Region
 Cypress High School Marching Band, Centurion Imperial Brigade, Cypress, California
 Escuela Secundaria General #5, Manuel R. Gutierrez – Banda Musical Delfines, Veracruz, Mexico
 Florida State University Marching Chiefs, Tallahassee, Florida (Rose Bowl-CFP participant)
 Helsingor Pipegarde – Elsinore Girls Marching Band, Denmark
 Koriyama Honor Green Band, Koriyama, Japan
 Robert E. Lee High School Mighty Rebel Band, Midland, Texas
 Lakota West High School Marching Firebirds, West Chester, Ohio
 Legacy High School Lightning Marching Band, Broomfield, Colorado
 LAUSD All District High School Honor Band, Los Angeles, California
 Maui High School's "Saber" Marching Band and Color Guard, Kahului, Hawaii
 O'Fallon Township High School Marching Panthers O'Fallon, Illinois
 University of Oregon Marching Band, Eugene, Oregon (Rose Bowl-CFP participant)
 Pasadena City College Tournament of Roses Honor Band and Herald Trumpets, Pasadena, California 
 Round Rock High School Dragon Band, Round Rock, Texas
 The Salvation Army Tournament of Roses Band, Los Angeles, California
 Temple City High School Marching Band, The Pride of Temple City, Temple City, California
 United States Marine Corps West Coast Composite Band
 Walton High School – Marching Raider Band, Marietta, Georgia

2016 (127th)
 Albany State University Marching Rams, Albany, Georgia
 Allen High School, The Allen Eagle Escadrille, Allen, Texas
 Centro Escolar José Maria Morelos y Pavón, Aguilas Doradas Marching Band, Puebla, Mexico
 Etiwanda High School, Etiwanda High School, Marching Eagle Regiment Rancho Cucamonga, California
 Franklin Regional High School Panther Band, Murrysville, Pennsylvania
 University of Iowa Hawkeye Marching Band, Iowa City, Iowa (Rose Bowl participant)
 Instituto Pedro Molina, Latin Band Pedro Molina, Coatepeque, Guatemala (unable to participate)
 Jenks High School Trojan Pride, Jenks, Oklahoma
 LAUSD All District High School Honor Band, Los Angeles, California
 Mira Mesa High School Sapphire Sound and Color Guard, San Diego, California
 Pasadena City College Tournament of Roses Honor Band and Herald Trumpets, Pasadena, California 
 Plymouth-Canton Educational Park Marching Band, Canton, Michigan
 Punahou School, Punahou Marching Band, Honolulu, Hawaii 
 Saratoga High School Marching Band and Color Guard, Saratoga, California
 The Salvation Army Tournament of Roses Band, Los Angeles, California
 Leland Stanford Junior University Marching Band, Stanford, California (Rose Bowl participant)
 Toho High School Dragon Band, Nagoya, Japan
 United States Marine Corps West Coast Composite Band, San Diego, California
 Virginia Military Institute Regimental Band and Pipe Band, Lexington, Virginia
 William Mason High School Marching Band, Mason, Ohio
 Wyoming All-State Marching Band, Cheyenne, Wyoming

2017 (128th)
 Arcadia High School, Arcadia, California
 Bands of America Honor Band, USA
 Broken Arrow High School, The Pride of Broken Arrow, Oklahoma
 Buhos Marching Band, Xalapa, Veracruz, Mexico
 Foothill High School, Henderson, Nevada
 Gifusho Green Band, Gifu, Japan
 Grove City High School, Ohio
 Marching Pride of Lawrence Township, Indianapolis, Indiana
 LAUSD All District High School Honor Band, Los Angeles, California
 Martin Luther King, Jr. High School, MLK "Kings of Halftime," Lithonia, Georgia
 Niceville High School, Florida
 Ooltewah High School, Tennessee
 Pasadena City College Tournament of Roses Honor Band and Herald Trumpets, Pasadena, California 
 Penn State University Marching Blue Band, State College, Pennsylvania (Rose Bowl participant)
 Pulaski High School, Red Raider Marching Band, Wisconsin
 The Salvation Army Tournament of Roses Band, Los Angeles, California
 Santa Clara Vanguard Drum and Bugle Corps, Santa Clara, California
 United States Marine Corps, West Coast Composite Band, San Diego, California
 United States Air Force Band, Washington, DC
 University of Southern California Trojan Marching Band, Los Angeles, California (Rose Bowl participant)
 Westlake High School, Austin, Texas

2018 (129th)
 Air Academy High School - Air Academy High School Marching Band, USAF Academy, CO
 Albertville Aggies Marching Band, Alabama
 Australia's Marching Koalas, Dangar, New South Wales, Australia
 Banda De Música Herberto López - Colegio José Daniel Crespo, Chitré, Herrera, Republic of Panamá
 Burlington Teen Tour Band, Burlington, Ontario, Canada
 Georgia Redcoat Marching Band, Athens, Georgia (Rose Bowl-CFP participant)
 Homestead High School – Homestead High School Mighty Mustang Marching Band, Cupertino, CA
 Kyoto Tachibana High School - Kyoto Tachibana High School Green Band, Kyoto, Japan
 LAUSD All District High School Honor Band, Los Angeles, California
 Lindbergh High School Spirit of Saint Louis Marching Band, St. Louis, Missouri
 Londonderry High School Marching Lancer Band, New Hampshire
 Louisburg High School Marching Wildcat Band, Louisburg, Kansas
 Pasadena City College Tournament of Roses Honor Band and Herald Trumpets, Pasadena, California 
 Pennsbury High School "The Long Orange Line" Marching Band, Fairless Hills, Pennsylvania 
 The Pride of Oklahoma Marching Band, Norman, Oklahoma (Rose Bowl-CFP participant)
 Ronald Reagan High School Marching Band, San Antonio, Texas
 The Salvation Army Tournament of Roses Band, Los Angeles, California
 Santiago High School Marching Band and Color Guard, Corona, California
 “The Commandant’s Own” The United States Marine Drum & Bugle Corps, Washington, DC
 United States Marine Corps West Coast Composite Band, MCAS Miramar, MCRD San Diego and Camp Pendleton, CA
 University of Massachusetts Minuteman Marching Band, Massachusetts
 Westlake High School Marching Thunder, Saratoga Springs, Utah

2019 (130th)

 Alabama State University Mighty Marching Hornets Montgomery, AL
  All-Izumo Honor Green Band, Izumo, Japan
  Banda Escolar de Guayanilla Puerto Rico, Guayanilla, Puerto Rico
  Banda Municipal de Acosta, Acosta, San José, Costa Rica
 Calgary Stampede Showband, Calgary, Alberta, Canada
Cavalcade of Bands Honor Band, Mid-Atlantic Region
 Florida A&M University, The Incomparable Marching "100", Tallahassee, Florida
 Flower Mound High School Band, Flower Mound, TX
Henry J. Kaiser High School - Kaiser Catamount Pride Band & Color Guard, Fontana, California
  Lincoln-Way Marching Band, Frankfort, IL
 Los Angeles Unified School District – All District High School Honor Band, Los Angeles, CA
 Mercer Island High School Marching Band, Mercer Island, WA
 Munford High School Band, Munford, TN
  Na Koa Ali`I - Hawai`i All-State Marching Band, Kaneohe, HI
 The Ohio State University Marching Band, Columbus, OH (Rose Bowl Participant)
 Pacific Crest Drum and Bugle Corps, Diamond Bar, CA
 Pasadena City College Tournament of Roses Honor Band & Herald Trumpets, Pasadena, CA
  Pickerington Marching Band, Pickerington, OH
 Royal Swedish Cadet Band, Karlskrona, Sweden
  The Lassiter High School Marching Trojan Band, Marietta, Georgia
  The Salvation Army Tournament of Roses Band, Long Beach, CA
 United States Marine Corps West Coast Composite Band, San Diego, CA
 University of Washington Husky Marching Band, Seattle, WA (Rose Bowl Participant)

2020 (131st)
 Aguiluchos Marching Band (Puebla, Mexico)
 Alhambra Unified School District High School Band, Alhambra, CA
 The Baldwinsville Central School District Marching Bees, Baldwinsville, NY
 Banda El Salvador: Grande Como Su Gente (El Salvador)
 Banda Municipal de Zarcero (Alajuela, Costa Rica)
 Centenaria Banda Colegial – University of Puerto Rico (Mayaguez, Puerto Rico)
 Dobyns-Bennett High School Marching Band, Kingsport, TN
 Greendale High School, Greendale, WI
 Helsingør Pigegarde (Hornbaek, Denmark)
 Japan Honor Green Band (Kyoto, Japan)
 Kamehameha Schools Kapalama Warrior Marching Band & Color Guard, Honolulu, HI
 Los Angeles Unified School District – All District High School Honor Band, Los Angeles, CA
 Oregon Marching Band (Rose Bowl participant)
 The Pride of Owasso, Owasso, OK
 Pasadena City College Tournament of Roses Honor Band & Herald Trumpets, Pasadena, CA
 The Pride of Pearland marching band, Pearland, TX
 Rancho Verde High School Crimson Regiment, Moreno Valley, CA
 The Salvation Army Tournament of Roses Band, Long Beach, CA
 United States Marine Corps West Coast Composite Band, San Diego, CA
 West Harrison High School Hurricane Band, The Pride of South Mississippi, Gulfport, MS
 University of Wisconsin Marching Band, Madison, Wisconsin (Rose Bowl participant)
 Southern University "Human Jukebox" Marching Band, Baton Rouge, LA

2021 (132nd)
 Parade cancelled due to the pandemic. The bands selected for the 2021 parade were invited to march on January 1, 2022.

2022 (133rd)
 Arcadia High School Apache Marching Band and Color Guard, Arcadia, CA
 Bands of America Honor Band, Music for All, Indianapolis, IN
 Broken Arrow High School, The Pride of Broken Arrow, Oklahoma (revoked attendance)
 Downingtown High School Blue and Gold Marching Band, Downingtown, PA
 Georgia State University Panther Band, Atlanta, GA
 Gibson County Tennessee Mass Band, Dyer, TN
 Hebron High School Mighty Hawk Band, Carrollton, Texas
 Homewood High School Patriot Band, Homewood, AL
 Los Angeles Unified School District – All District High School Honor Band, Los Angeles, CA
 The Mira Mesa High School "Sapphire Sound" Marching Band and Color Guard, San Diego, CA
 Ohio State University Marching Band, Columbus, Ohio (Rose Bowl participant)
 O'Fallon Township High School Marching Panthers, O'Fallon, IL
 Pasadena City College Tournament of Roses Honor Band & Herald Trumpets, Pasadena, CA
 The Salvation Army Tournament of Roses Band, Los Angeles, CA
 Tennessee State University Aristocrat of Bands, Nashville, TN
 University of Utah Marching Band, Salt Lake City, UT (Rose Bowl participant)
 United States Marine Corps West Coast Composite Band, San Diego and Camp Pendleton,CA
 The Waukee Warrior Regiment, Waukee, IA

2023 (134th, Monday January 2, 2023)
 Due to travel restrictions in 2021, international bands are invited to participate in the 2023 Rose Parade instead of the 2022 Rose Parade.
 All Gifu Honor Green Band, Gifu, Japan
 Banda de Musica La Primavera, Santiago de Veraguas, Panama
 Brookwood High School Marching Band, Snellville, GA
 Buhos Marching Band, Veracruz, Mexico
 Catalina Foothills High School Marching Band Falcon Marching Band, Tucson, AZ
 Fresno State University Bulldog Marching Band, Fresno, CA
 Los Angeles Unified School District – All District High School Honor Band, Los Angeles, CA
 Northwoods Marching Band, Eagle River, WI
 Norfolk State University Spartan Legion Marching Band, Norfolk, VA
 Pasadena City College Tournament of Roses Honor Band & Herald Trumpets, Pasadena, CA
 Pella Community School District's Pella Marching Dutch Band, Pella, Iowa
 Rockford High School Marching Band, Rockford, MI
 Rosemount High School Marching Band, Rosemount, MN 
 Salvation Army Tournament of Roses Band, Los Angeles, CA
 Taipei First Girls High School Marching Band, Honor Guard and Color Guard, Taipei, Taiwan, Republic of China
 Triuggio Marching Band Triuggio, Monza, and Brianza, Italy
 United States Marine Corps West Coast Composite Band, San Diego and Camp Pendleton,CA
  Vista Ridge High School Marching Band, Cedar Park, TX
 Penn State University Marching Blue Band, State College, Pennsylvania (Rose Bowl participant)
 University of Utah Marching Band, Salt Lake City, UT (Rose Bowl participant)

2024 (135th)
 Albertville High School Aggie Marching Band, Albertville, Alabama
 Banda Municipal de Zarcero, Zarcero, Costa Rica
 John H. Castle High School Marching Knights, Newburgh, Indiana
 Jenks High School Trojan Pride Marching Band, Jenks, Oklahoma
 Niceville High School Eagle Pride Band, Niceville, Florida
 North Carolina A&T State University Blue & Gold Marching Machine, Greensboro, North Carolina
 Los Angeles Unified School District – All District High School Honor Band, Los Angeles, CA
 William Mason High School Marching Band, Mason, Ohio
 The Na Koa Ali'i - Hawaii All State Marching Band, Kailua, Hawaii 
 Pasadena City College Tournament of Roses Honor Band & Herald Trumpets, Pasadena, CA
 Pulaski High School Red Raider Marching Band, Pulaski, Wisconsin
 Salvation Army Tournament of Roses Band, Los Angeles, CA
 BOSS, Band of Santiago High School, Corona, California
 Tōhō Marching Band (TMB), Nagoya, Aichi Prefecture, Japan
 The West Chester University Golden Rams Marching Band, West Chester, PA
 Bands from the two universities participating in the National Semifinals of the College Football Playoff at the Rose Bowl Game

HBCU Style Bands
 Alabama A&M University Marching Band (2006)
 Albany State University Marching Band (2016)
 Florida A&M University Marching Band (2019)
 Morris Brown College Marching Band (1971, 1995)
 Norfolk State University Spartan Legion Marching Band (2023)
 North Carolina Central University Marching Band (2011)
 Prairie View A&M University Marching Band (2009)
 Southern University Marching Band (1980, 2020)
 Tennessee State University Marching Band (2022)

Non Rose Bowl Affiliated University Marching Bands
 Alabama A&M University Marching Band (2006)
 Albany State University Marching Band (2016)
 California State University Marching Band (1977)
 Centenaria Banda Colegial – University of Puerto Rico (2020)
 Florida A&M University Marching Band (2019)
 Fresno State University Bulldog Marching Band (2023)
 Georgia State University Marching Band (2022)
 Loyola University Marching Band (1938)
 Missouri State University Pride Marching Band (2008)
 Morris Brown College Marching Band (1971, 1995)
 Norfolk State University Spartan Legion Marching Band (2023)
 North Carolina Central University Marching Band (2011)
 Prairie View A&M University Marching Band (2009)
 San Jose State University Marching Band (1981)
 South Dakota State University Marching Band (2003, 2008)
 Southwest Missouri State University Marching Band (1995)
 Southern University Marching Band (1980, 2020)
 Tennessee State University Marching Band (2022)
 University of Massachusetts Marching Band (2018)
 Western Carolina University Marching Band (2011)

References

External links 

Bands
Marching bands